The 2005 Nordic Figure Skating Championships were held from February 11th through 13th, 2005 at the Askerhallen in Asker, Norway. The competition was open to elite figure skaters from Nordic countries. Skaters competed in four disciplines, men's singles, ladies' singles, pair skating, and ice dancing, across two levels: senior (Olympic-level) and junior. Pairs and ice dancing competitions were held only at the junior level. The junior compulsory dance was the Argentine Tango.

Senior results

Men

Ladies

Junior results

Men

Ladies
In the free skating, Anna Heinonen of Finland and Natasha Lee Dann of Denmark tied for 14th place.

Pairs

Ice dancing

External links
 2005 Nordics

Nordic Figure Skating Championships, 2005
Nordic Figure Skating Championships
International figure skating competitions hosted by Norway
Nordic Figure Skating Championships, 2005